Algoma—Manitoulin—Kapuskasing is a federal electoral district in Ontario, Canada, that has been represented in the House of Commons of Canada since 2004. The area was represented by the riding of Algoma from 1867 to 1904 and from 1968 to 1996 and then by Algoma—Manitoulin from 1996 to 2004.

Demographics
 Ethnic groups: 84.3% White, 14.6% Native Canadian
 Languages: 60.1% English, 32.1% French, 6.1% Other, 1.7% Multiple responses
 Religions: 58.5% Catholic, 26.6% Protestant, 1.6% Other Christian, 10.2% No affiliation
 Average income: $25,976

Geography
The district includes the eastern, northern and central parts of Algoma District, the extreme northwestern part and extreme southwestern part of Sudbury District, the extreme southeastern part of Thunder Bay District, all of Manitoulin District, and western Cochrane District along the Trans Canada highway. Large communities include Elliot Lake, Kapuskasing, Hearst, Espanola, Wawa, Manitouwadge, Blind River, Sables-Spanish Rivers, Chapleau, and Northeastern Manitoulin and the Islands. The area is 103,364 km2.

History
The electoral district was created in 2003. 71.7% of the population of the riding came from Algoma—Manitoulin, and 28.3% from Timmins—James Bay.

Algoma was created in the British North America Act and consisted of the Provisional Judicial District of Algoma District. In 1882, the district consisted of the area between the Provisional Thunder Bay District and the Province of Manitoba. In 1892, it consisted of all areas of Ontario west of the Nipissing electoral district, and also included Manitoulin Island and the islands around it. The district was abolished in 1903 when it was redistributed into Algoma East and Algoma West ridings.

A new Algoma district was created from Algoma East and Algoma West in 1966. It consisted of most of Algoma District except the extreme north and northwestern portions, and Sault Ste. Marie. It also included Manitoulin Island, nearby islands, and the southwestern corner of Sudbury. In 1976, the district was expanded to the north, and to include the suburbs of Sault Ste. Marie, Whitefish River Indian Reserve, and more of the southwestern part of Sudbury District.

In 1987, it was expanded to include part of the city of Sault Ste. Marie, the part of Rankin Indian Reserve within city limits, more of western Sudbury District, all of Manitoulin District, and much of southcentral Sudbury District. There were also some boundary changes in the north part of the Algoma district.

In 1996, the district consisted of all of Algoma District except Sault Ste. Marie, the northwestern corner and the southwestern corner of Sudbury District, Manitoulin District, and the southeastern corner of Thunder Bay District.

In 1997, the name of the district was changed to Algoma—Manitoulin.

Most of the riding was redistributed in 2003 into Algoma—Manitoulin—Kapuskasing, with small parts going to Nickel Belt and Sault Ste. Marie ridings.

This riding gained territory from Sault Ste. Marie and Nickel Belt during the 2012 electoral redistribution.

Members of Parliament

This riding has elected the following Members of Parliament:

Election results

Algoma—Manitoulin—Kapuskasing (2003–present)

Algoma—Manitoulin (1997–2003)

Algoma (1966–1997)

Algoma (1867–1903)

On Mr. Simpson's resignation to become Indian Commissioner for the North:

See also
 List of Canadian federal electoral districts
 Past Canadian electoral districts

References

Notes

External links
Riding history for Algoma 1867-1904 from the Library of Parliament
Riding history for Algoma 1968-1993 from the Library of Parliament
Riding history for Algoma—Manitoulin 1997-2004 from the Library of Parliament
Riding history from the Library of Parliament
2011 results from Elections Canada
Expenditures - 2008

Elliot Lake
Espanola, Ontario
Kapuskasing
Ontario federal electoral districts